The Malvatu Mauri (Bislama) (National Council of Chiefs) is a formal advisory body of chiefs recognised by the Constitution of the Republic of Vanuatu.  

Members of the Council are elected by their fellow chiefs sitting in district councils of chiefs.  The Council plays a significant role in advising the government on all matters concerning ni-Vanuatu culture and languages.

"Mal" means chief, "vatu" means stone, island, or place, and "mauri" means something that is alive.

See also  

 House of Chiefs (Fiji)

References

Government of Vanuatu
Politics of Vanuatu
Vanuatuan culture
Tribal chiefs